Gilbert Heron Miller (July 3, 1884 – January 3, 1969) was an American theatrical producer.

Born in New York City, he was the son of English-born theatrical producer Henry Miller and Bijou Heron, a former child actress. Raised and educated in Europe, he returned home to follow in his father's footsteps and became a highly successful Broadway producer. Miller served as director of the League of New York Theatres as well as an officer of the Actors Fund. He brought the successful German-language play By Candlelight to New York in 1929 with a translation by P. G. Wodehouse. He also managed the St James's Theatre in London.

Nominated three times, Gilbert Miller won the Tony Award for Best Play in 1950 for his production of The Cocktail Party. In 1965, he was given a Special Tony Award "for having produced 88 plays and musicals and for his perseverance which has helped to keep New York and theatre alive."

Gilbert Miller died in 1969 and was interred in the Woodlawn Cemetery in The Bronx, New York.

Private life 
Miller's first wife was Jessie F. Glendinning, whom he divorced.  She was an actress and the daughter of the actor John Glendinning, and the sister of Ernest Glendinning. They had one daughter, Dorothy.

His second wife was Mary Margaret Allen; they divorced.

His third wife was Kathryn (Kitty) Bache (1896–1979), a daughter of the Wall Street financier Jules Bache, a supporter of American theatre who in 1941 helped found the New York branch of the Escholier Club. They married in 1927 in Paris, France. Columbia University's Kathryn Bache Miller Theatre was named in her honor.

References

External links 

 
 
 
 Gilbert Miller portrait probably in 1930s or 40s but certainly not 1910 as listed. The suit is not a 1910 era suit (Univ. of Washington/Sayre Collection)
 THE SWAN touring company 1924 Detroit; Gilbert Miller stands 6th from right in rear, under the A in Opera on building

1884 births
1969 deaths
American entertainment industry businesspeople
American theatre managers and producers
Businesspeople from New York City
American people of English descent
Burials at Woodlawn Cemetery (Bronx, New York)
20th-century American businesspeople
Special Tony Award recipients
Tony Award winners